MV Empire Abercorn was a cargo and passenger ship that was built in 1944, renamed MV Rakaia in 1946 and remained in service until 1971.

History
Empire Abercorn was built by Harland & Wolff, Belfast for the MoWT and was initially managed by the New Zealand Shipping Co, London. She was sold to the New Zealand Shipping Co in 1946 and renamed Rakaia. In 1950, Rakaia was converted to a cadet training ship, and the accommodation reduced from 45 passengers to 40 cadets. Her first voyage in this role started on 10 June 1950. On 16 February 1955, a dockside fire at Wellington, New Zealand threatened to spread to Arawa, Port Pirie, Rakaia, and Rangitoto.

On 16 October 1957, on a voyage between New York City and Liverpool, No. 8 piston rod in the engine snapped. The weather deteriorated, and the ship was rolling, making repairs difficult. To stabilize Rakaia, it was decided to jury rig a set of sails. Tarpaulin sails were made from hatch covers. The engine was reduced from eight to six cylinders, running at a maximum of 50 rpm; it took eleven days to reach Liverpool.

On 28 December 1966, Rakaia was sold to the Federal Steam Navigation Co, remaining under the management of the New Zealand Shipping Co. Her last voyage as a cadet training ship ended on 28 March 1968. Rakaia was sold to the Lee Sing Company, Hong Kong on 22 August 1971 for scrapping.

Engine and generators
Empire Abercorn had an eight-cylinder, two-cycle double-acting diesel engine built by Harland & Wolff. It produced 7,500 hp at 115 rpm. Normal operating speed about 101.2 rpm, giving a fuel consumption of 28 tons per day.

Empire Abercorn had four main generators and one auxiliary generator. The main generators were "Harlandics", built by Harland and Wolff. They were powered by six-cylinder diesel engines of  producing 250 kW each ; the auxiliary generator was powered by a three-cylinder diesel engine of  producing 15 kW, voltage was 220 volts.

Official number and code letters
Official numbers were a forerunner to IMO Numbers.

Empire Abercorn had the UK official number 166215 and call sign GFGW. Towards the end of her life, Rakaia was given IMO Number 5289481.

References

1944 ships
Ships built in Belfast
Ministry of War Transport ships
Ships of the New Zealand Shipping Company
Merchant ships of the United Kingdom
Ships built by Harland and Wolff